Tropaeas is a genus of sea snails, marine gastropod mollusks in the family Pyramidellidae, the pyrams and their allies.

General description
The surface of the shell is marked by strong axial ribs. The intercostal spaces are spirally pitted. The early teleoconch whorls are  sculptured differently from the later ones. The shell is umbilicated and contains two columellar folds.

Species
 Tropaeas badia (A. Adams, 1863)
 Tropaeas brunneomaculata (Melvill, 1897)
 Tropaeas castanea (A. Adams, 1863)
 Tropaeas crassicostata (Sowerby III, 1901)
 Tropaeas enelata (Melvill, 1910)
 Tropaeas gracilis (A. Adams, 1854)
 Tropaeas gradatula (Melvill, J.C. & R. Standen, 1897)
 Tropaeas halaibensis Sturany, 1903
 Tropaeas imperforata Laseron, 1959
 Tropaeas livida (Sowerby III, 1901)
 Tropaeas luteomaculosa (Nomura, 1938)
 Tropaeas natalensis E. A. Smith, 1906
 Tropaeas strigulata (A.Adams, 1862)
 Tropaeas subulata (A. Adams, 1853)
Species brought into synonymy
 Tropaeas castaneus [sic] : synonym of Tropaeas castanea (A. Adams, 1863)
 Tropaeas fortiplicata Nomura, 1936: synonym of Siogamaia fortiplicata (Nomura, 1936)
 Tropaeas strigatula [sic] : synonym of Tropaeas strigulata (A. Adams, 1863)
 Tropaeas strigillata [sic] : synonym of Tropaeas strigulata (A. Adams, 1863)
 Tropaeas teres (A. Adams, 1861): synonym of Longchaeus turritus (A. Adams, 1854)

The Indo-Pacific Molluscan Database also includes the following species:
 Tropaeas contracta (Saurin, 1959)
 Tropaeas dubia (Schepman, 1909)
 Tropaeas hadwigis Thiele, 1925
 Tropaeas isolda Thiele, 1925
 Tropaeas lanassae Hornung & Mermod, 1924
 Tropaeas latonae Hornung & Mermod, 1924
 Tropaeas luteomaculosa (Nomura, 1938)
 Tropaeas secunda (Saurin, 1959)
 Tropaeas stylifera Thiele, 1925
 Tropaeas subcarnea (Schepman, 1909)
 Tropaeas subglabra (Odhner, 1919)

References

External links
 To World Register of Marine Species

Pyramidellidae